William Wootton (27 August 1904 – 2000) was an English footballer who played as a full-back for Stoke, Congleton Town, Port Vale, and Southend United. He later managed Northwich Victoria, Oldham Athletic, and Halifax Town. He won the Third Division North title with Port Vale in 1929–30, and led Northwich Victoria to victory in the Cheshire Senior Cup in 1937.

Playing career
Wootton played for Trentham, Stoke and Congleton Town, before joining Port Vale in June 1925. He made three Second Division appearances in the 1925–26 season. He remained a bit-part player for the "Valiants", featuring seven times in 1926–27, 12 times in 1927–28, and six times in 1928–29. Vale were relegated in 1929, and Wootton played 20 league games in 1929–30 as Vale won the Third Division North title. However, he only played four games in 1930–31 and six games in 1931–32.

In August 1932, he was transferred to Third Division South side Southend United. He became the player-manager of Cheshire County League club Northwich Victoria in 1935. He spent 12 years at Drill Field, leading them to the Cheshire Senior Cup in 1937.

Management career
After leaving the position of player-manager with Northwich Victoria, Wootton became the manager of Third Division North side Oldham Athletic in June 1947. He oversaw 141 games at Boundary Park and achieved a 38.28 win percentage but failed to gain the club the promotion to the Second Division they craved. He left Oldham in September 1950 and took up the reins at Halifax Town the following year. He spent just one season with Halifax, and left The Shay after leading the "Shaymen" to a 20th-place finish in the Third Division North in 1951–52.

Career statistics

Playing statistics
Source:

Managerial statistics
Source:

Honours
Port Vale
Football League Third Division North: 1929–30

Northwich Victoria
Cheshire Senior Cup: 1937

References

People from Longton, Staffordshire
Footballers from Stoke-on-Trent
English footballers
Association football fullbacks
Stoke City F.C. players
Port Vale F.C. players
Southend United F.C. players
Congleton Town F.C. players
Northwich Victoria F.C. players
English Football League players
Association football player-managers
English football managers
Northwich Victoria F.C. managers
Oldham Athletic A.F.C. managers
Halifax Town A.F.C. managers
English Football League managers
1904 births
2000 deaths